Elachista drenovoi is a moth of the family Elachistidae that is endemic to North Macedonia. It is quite large with a wingspan of 55 to 70 cm.

References

drenovoi
Moths described in 1981
Moths of Europe